John Kelly ( – death unknown) was an English rugby union and professional rugby league footballer who played in the 1930s and 1940s.

Leeds career
On Saturday 24 December 1938 Leeds played Salford at Headingley Rugby Stadium. However, because the rugby pitch was frozen, the match was switched to the cricket field. Vic Hey scored the only try of the match, and Jack Kelly became the only player to ever kick a goal on the cricket pitch in a 5-0 win. He spent most of his career at Leeds behind Charles "Charlie" Eaton for the  position, but he still managed to play in 83 matches, mainly during the Emergency Leagues throughout World War II.

Note
Someone named Jack Kelly played rugby league for Wests and North Sydney during the 1920s and 1930s, and someone named J Kelly played rugby league for Newtown Bluebags during the 1940s; however, these footballers are unlikely to be this Jack Kelly.

References

External links
Search for "Kelly" at rugbyleagueproject.org

(archived by web.archive.org) Profile at leedsrugby.dnsupdate.co.uk
Profile at saints.org.uk

1917 births
English rugby league players
English rugby union players
Leeds Rhinos players
Place of birth missing
Place of death missing
Rugby league fullbacks
Rugby league players from Leeds
Rugby union fullbacks
Rugby union players from Leeds
St Helens R.F.C. players
Year of death missing